A limousine ( or ), or limo for short, is a large, chauffeur-driven luxury vehicle with a partition between the driver compartment and the passenger compartment.

A very long wheelbase luxury sedan (with more than four doors) driven by a professional driver is called a stretch limousine.

In some countries, such as the United States, Germany, Canada, and Australia, a limousine service may be any pre-booked hire car with driver, usually but not always a luxury car. In particular, airport shuttle services are often called limousine services though they often use minibuses.



Etymology 

The word limousine is derived from the name of the French region Limousin. However, how the name of the region transferred to the car is uncertain.

One possibility involves a particular type of carriage hood or roof that physically resembled the raised hood of the cloak worn by the shepherds there.

An alternate etymology speculates that some early chauffeurs wore a Limousin-style cloak in the open driver's compartment, for protection from the weather. The name was then extended to this particular type of car with a permanent top projecting over the chauffeur. This former type of automobile had an enclosed passenger compartment seating three to five persons, with only a roof projecting forward over the open driver's area in the front.

History 
Rich owners of expensive carriages and their passengers were accustomed to their own private compartments leaving their coachman or driver outside in all weathers. When automobiles arrived the same people required a similar arrangement for their chauffeurs. As such, the 1916 definition of limousine by the US Society of Automobile Engineers is "a closed car seating three to five inside, with driver's seat outside".

In Great Britain, the limousine de-ville was a version of the limousine town car where the driver's compartment was outside and had no weather protection. The limousine-landaulet variant (also sold in the United States) had a removable or folding roof section over the rear passenger seat.

In the United States, sub-categories of limousines in 1916 were the berline defined as "a limousine having the driver's seat entirely enclosed", and the brougham, defined as "a limousine with no roof over the driver's seat."

Characteristics 
The limousine body style usually has a partition separating the driver from the rear passenger compartment. This partition includes a usually openable glass section so passengers may see the road.  Communication with the driver is possible either by opening the window in the partition or by using an intercom system.

Limousines are often long-wheelbase vehicles, in order to provide extra legroom in the passenger compartment. There will usually be occasional seats (in the U.S. called jump seats) at the front of the compartment (either forward-facing, rear-facing or able to face either direction).

Many nations have official state cars designed to transport government officials. The top leaders have dedicated and specially equipped limousines. The United States Presidential State Car is the official car of the President of the United States.

Stretch limousines 

Stretch limousines are longer than regular limousines, usually in order to accommodate more passengers. Stretch limousines may have seating along the sides of the cabin.

A "stretch limousine" was created in Fort Smith, Arkansas, around 1928 by a coach company named Armbruster. Armbruster's cars were primarily used to transport famous "big band" leaders, such as Glenn Miller and Benny Goodman, and their bands and equipment. These early stretch limousines were often called "big band buses". Armbruster called their lengthened cars "extended-wheelbase multi-door auto-coaches". Their 12-passenger people movers were used by hotels, taxis, airlines, corporations, and tour companies. Knock-down programs by automakers made coachbuilders stretch vehicles, but Armbruster also custom built limousines using unibody construction such as the 1969 AMC Ambassadors.

Novelty limousines
A variety of vehicles have been converted into novelty limousines. They are used for weddings, parties, and other social occasions. Another style of novelty limousine are those painted in bright colors, such as purple or pink.

Vehicles converted into novelty stretch limousines include the East German Trabant, Volkswagen Beetle, Fiat Panda, and Citroën 2CV. There are instances of Corvettes, Ferraris, and Mini Coopers being stretched to accommodate up to 10 passengers.

United States 

The last production limousine, by Cadillac, with forward-facing jump seats, was in 1987 (with their Fleetwood Series 75 model), the last Packard in 1954, and the last Lincoln in 1939, though Lincoln has offered limousines through their dealers as special order vehicles at times. Several Lincoln Premier cars were also built, one being owned by Elvis Presley. Vehicles of this type in private use may contain expensive audio players, televisions, video players, and bars, often with refrigerators. The President of the United States has ridden in a variety of brands of limousine stretching back to 1899.

United Kingdom 

Due to the partition behind the driver, the Hackney carriages are a type of limousine, although not typically identified as such in Britain. The occasional seats, also referred to as taxi-tip-seats, usually carry advertising on the underside; the advertisements are visible to the passengers when the tip-seats are not in use.

Current limousine production
Examples of limousines currently produced by vehicle manufacturers include:
 Aurus Senat
 Lincoln MKT Livery
 Lincoln Navigator L
 Mercedes-Benz Pullman

See also

 Car classification
 Party bus

References

 
 
Car body styles
Car classifications
Luxury vehicles
Vehicles for hire

fr:Type de carrosserie#Limousine